Ricker Canyon is a steep-sided, ice-filled canyon that indents the north escarpment of Buckeye Table between Darling Ridge and Schulthess Buttress, in the Ohio Range, Horlick Mountains. Named by Advisory Committee on Antarctic Names (US-ACAN) for John F. Ricker, geologist with the Ohio State University expedition to the Horlick Mountains in 1961–62.
 

Canyons and gorges of Antarctica
Landforms of Marie Byrd Land